The OTs-14 Groza is a Russian selective fire bullpup assault rifle chambered for the 7.62×39 round and the 9×39mm subsonic round. It was developed in the 1990s at the TsKIB SOO (Central Design and Research Bureau of Sporting and Hunting Arms) in Tula, Russia.

The weapon is colloquially known as OC-14 or OTs-14 "Groza". The OTs-14-4A "Groza-4" has one derivative, the TKB-0239 (ТКБ-0239), also known as OTs-14-1A "Groza-1", chambered for the 7.62×39mm round.

The Groza saw limited use in 1999 in the Second Chechen War, however they quickly fell out of favor and are no longer produced.

History
Work on the OTs-14-4A project began in December 1992. The weapon's chief designers were Valery Telesh, responsible for the GP-25 and GP-30 under-barrel grenade launchers, and Yuri Lebedev. The team set out to design an integrated and modular system that would incorporate all the best features of a close-combat long gun into a single weapon based on the AKS-74U. Prototypes were ready for testing in less than a year and the weapon was ready for production by early 1994.

It was first presented to the public at the MILIPOL Moscow trade show in April 1994 and adopted by the Ministry of Internal Affairs (MVD) shortly thereafter. The success of the OTs-14-4A in the hands of MVD personnel brought it to the attention of the Ministry of Defence (MO), who also had a requirement for such a weapon. After a period of testing, the weapon was adopted for Spetsnaz forces and some airborne and specialist front-line combat units such as combat engineers.

The Groza was originally intended to have used any one of four cartridges: 5.45×39mm, 5.56×45mm NATO, 7.62×39mm or 9×39mm. That idea was dropped and the assault rifle was originally chambered in 9×39mm to meet the MVD's requirement for a close combat weapon for deployment in Chechnya, for situations when the user needs to take on hostiles silently. This is why they used the subsonic ammo: 9×39mm, 5.45×39mm would later be used in minor cases.

Design details
Internally the OTs-14 "Groza" is an exact copy of AKS-74U but in a bullpup configuration and chambered for 9x39 SP-6 subsonic ammunition. The trigger-pistol grip unit could be removed and replaced with an alternative unit integral with 40 mm grenade launcher. In that configuration, a single trigger controls with a separate barrel selector both the 40 mm grenade launcher and the rifle itself. The grenade launcher can use the same grenades used in the GP-25/GP-30.

The safety/firing mode selector of AKS-74U pattern is retained. The barrel itself can be fitted with a specially designed quick-detachable suppressor.

The OTs-14's carrying handle has provisions for mounting long-range optical sights, red dot sights or night vision devices. As it was meant to replace the AKS-74U in the battalions of Spetsnaz MVD as a standard service firearm there are also variants chambered for 7.62×39mm. The idea behind this design was to have an easily modified basic version which would be used in different combat scenarios as a carbine, assault rifle with a foregrip, silenced assault rifle with detachable suppressor and assault rifle with an integrated under-barrel grenade launcher.

Operating mechanism
The OTs-14-4A is a small arms weapon system based on the 5.45×39mm AKS-74U carbine. It is a selective fire, air-cooled magazine-fed rifle with a gas-actuated piston operating system and a rotary bolt locking mechanism.

Features
The OTs-14-4A shares 75% of its components with the AKS-74U. The basic components of the weapon are borrowed directly from the AKS-74U assault rifle and slightly modified, simplifying the design as a whole and making the weapon considerably cheaper. The weapon has modular design allowing for assembly of one of four weapon versions depending on the assigned mission. It is configured in a bullpup layout for increased portability and balance. The grip is displaced forward, making the assault rifle compact, suitable for concealed carrying and so well balanced that it can be fired using just one hand, like a pistol. There has been mention that the bullpup configuration has been hard to carry due to the weight on occasions with the Kalashikov action positioned close to the user's face when fired, making it sometime hard to use.

The weapon fires from a closed bolt and has a hammer-type firing mechanism. It has a unitary trigger; a three-position combination fire mode selector switch / manual safety on the left side of the receiver sets whether it fires either the rifle or the grenade launcher or places it in "safe". The assault rifle is equipped with iron sights contained in the carrying handle that consist of an adjustable rear aperture sight on a tangent leaf with range graduations from 50 to 200 m, and a forward post. The grenade launcher is aimed using a folding leaf sight.

The weapon will also accept several optical sights, including the PSO telescopic sights which mount directly onto the carrying handle or, as on early models, onto a bracket on the left side of the receiver housing. The OTs-14-4A also has a night sight dovetail rail that will accept all standard night vision optics.

Accessories
It is issued in an aluminium transport case with equipment and accessories for a wide array of tactical situations. Included in the case are two different grip and trigger assemblies, one for use with the modified GP-25/30 grenade launcher and another for use when the launcher is detached. When the grenade launcher is installed, the combined rifle and grenade launcher is operated with a single trigger.

A selector switch on left side of the grip near the trigger guard allows the user to select between rifle or grenade barrels. When the grenade launcher is detached, it is replaced by a vertical grip. A suppressor is also included in the standard kit, as is a quick-change short barrel for use with the suppressor or for when maximum compactness is desired.

Variants

The following variants were made based on the Groza:

 OTs-14-1A Groza-1 – Primary model chambered in 7.62×39mm M43 Soviet; it uses the same magazines and parts as the AK-47 / AKM assault rifles. Originally an experimental chambering, it was later adopted by the Army in 1998 for use by its Airborne, Combat Engineering, and Spetsnaz troops. It has more hitting power and range than the subsonic version and can use cheaper ammunition readily available from supplies. Not fully developed and placed into production due to cancellation of funding. The receiver was based on the AKM and the flash hider is based on the AK-74.
 Groza-1 Special Mission Configuration – Variant of the Groza-1 with a riflescope and suppressor for special forces operations.
 OTs-14-1A-01 – Carbine Variant with a short barrel and a vertical foregrip, which acts to stabilize the weapon when used in full auto. The foregrip is also used to act as a flash hider.
 OTs-14-1A-02 – Special Carbine Variant with a short barrel threaded for a suppressor. This is intended for users involved in urban warfare operations.
 OTs-14-1A-03 – Special Sniper Variant with a short barrel threaded for a suppressor and a telescopic sight bracket on the carrying handle / iron sights.
 OTs-14-1A-04 7,62/40 – Grenade Launcher variant with a long barrel and a GP-30 under-barrel grenade launcher.
 OTs-14-2A – Experimental model chambered in 5.45×39mm M74 Soviet. Not adopted due to redundancy caused by preference for the better ballistic performance of the 7.62×39mm round when fired through a short barrel.
 OTs-14-3A – Experimental model chambered in 5.56×45mm NATO. Neither adopted nor put into production due to lack of additional funding for production of the variant.
 OTs-14-4A 9/40 Groza-4 – Primary model, chambered in 9×39mm Subsonic with a grenade launcher that has foldable iron sights. It uses the same 20-round magazines as the OTs-12 ("Yew tree") assault rifle. It was adopted in 1994 by the Ministry of the Interior's OMON Special Operations troops.
 OTs-14-4A-01 – Rifle configuration with a short barrel and a vertical foregrip.
 OTs-14-4A-02 – Carbine configuration with a short barrel threaded for a suppressor.
 OTs-14-4A-03 – Special/Sniper configuration with a short barrel threaded for a suppressor and a telescopic sight bracket on the carrying handle / iron sights.

Users 

: MVD forces in Chechnya.

Bibliography

References

7.62×39mm assault rifles
9×39mm firearms
Bullpup rifles
Kalashnikov derivatives
Assault rifles of Russia
TsKIB SOO products
Weapons and ammunition introduced in 1992